is a Japanese manga series by Moe Fujisaki. It is serialized in the monthly digital  manga magazine Comic Marginal beginning on June 7, 2019.

Plot

During a visit to a bookstore, a truck crashes into a book stand and Kotone dies buried under a pile of  books. When he wakes up, he finds himself in an alternate world with no women, where the divine snake beast, Nagi, takes him as his bride.

Characters

Media

Manga

Fudanshi Shōkan: Isekai de Shinjū ni Hameraremashita is written and illustrated by Moe Fujisaki. It is serialized digitally in Comic Marginal since June 7, 2019. The chapters were later released in two bound volumes by Futabasha under the Marginal Comics imprint. A four-episode mini animated series was released weekly on Futabasha's BL Twitter account to promote the release of the second volume. A second animated series consisting of three episodes is being released to commemorate the release of the fourth volume.

References

2019 manga
2010s LGBT literature
Isekai anime and manga
Josei manga
LGBT in anime and manga
Yaoi anime and manga
Futabasha manga